Etlingera sorsogonensis is a monocotyledonous plant species that was first described by Adolph Daniel Edward Elmer, and given its current name by Axel Dalberg Poulsen. Etlingera sorsogonensis is part of the genus Etlingera and the family Zingiberaceae. No subspecies are listed in the Catalog of Life.

References 

sorsogonensis